Stephen or Steven Hill may refer to:

Media 

 Steven Hill (1922–2016), American actor
 Stephen Clancy Hill (1976–2010), American pornographic actor
 Steven Hill (model), American reality television personality and model
 Stephen Hill (broadcaster), American producer and host of the Hearts of Space radio program
 Stevie B (Steven Bernard Hill, born 1958), American singer, songwriter, and producer

Sports
 Steve Hill (footballer) (1940–2010), English footballer
 Stephen Hill (footballer, born 1982), English footballer
 Stephen Hill (Australian footballer) (born 1990), Australian rules footballer
 Stephen Hill (American football) (born 1991), American football player
 Steven Hill (baseball) (born 1985), American baseball player
 Steven Hill (basketball) (born 1985), American professional basketball player
 Steve Hill (horse trainer), trainer of champion Tennessee Walking Horses
 Steven Hill (judoka) (born 1971), Australian judoka
 Steve Hill (bowls) (born 1957), Welsh lawn bowler

Other
 Stephen P. Hill (1806–1884), Baptist clergyman and legislative chaplain
 Steve Hill (evangelist) (1954–2014), clergyman and evangelist
 Stephen John Hill (1809–1891), British colonial governor 
 Stephen D. Hill (born 1950), judge on the Kansas Court of Appeals
 Steven Hill (author) (born 1958), political writer, author and political reformer
 Stephen Hill (academic) (born 1946), professor of management at the University of London
 Stephen Hill (entrepreneur) (born 1962), Australian skateboard and streetwear entrepreneur, producer and advocate
 Steven A. Hill, director of research at Research England